The Mangfall Bridge is a motorway bridge across the valley of the Mangfall north of Weyarn in Upper Bavaria, Germany, which carries Bundesautobahn 8 between Munich and Rosenheim. The original bridge, designed by German Bestelmeyer, opened in January 1936 as one of the first large bridges in the Reichsautobahn system and was influential in its design. Destroyed at the end of World War II, this bridge was replaced with a temporary structure in 1948; the current bridge consists of a replacement built in 1958–60 to a design by Gerd Lohmer and Ulrich Finsterwalder and a second span for traffic in one direction which was added in the late 1970s when the autobahn was widened to six lanes.

Original bridge
The original bridge was one of the first large bridges constructed for the Reichsautobahn system under the Third Reich, and was the model for many that followed. Hitler selected German Bestelmeyer's design; with a single deck and only two massive support pylons, in concrete rather than steel, it was preferred on aesthetic grounds, and a model of one of the pylons dominated the Reichsautobahn section of the Gibt mir vier Jahre Zeit (Give me four years) exhibition of Nazi achievements in 1937. Its construction was a particularly favoured topic of the painters commissioned by Fritz Todt to document the Reichsautobahn, and also of documentary filmmakers, and the finished bridge was also one of the Reichsautobahn scenes depicted on a postage stamp in 1936. It was the most successful steel bridge on the Reichsautobahn and served as a model for several that followed.

Construction began in March 1934 and was mainly carried out by MAN SE of Gustavsburg. Completion of the two pylons was celebrated on 24 November. On 6 January 1936, Hitler was first to drive across the bridge. The autobahn segment was opened to traffic on 11 January.

In 1945, the retreating Wehrmacht destroyed the bridge with explosives: the deck and the western pylon were completely destroyed, the eastern pylon badly damaged.

1948 temporary bridge
Beginning in 1946, the bridge was rebuilt. A temporary steel truss bridge of the type designed by Gottwalt Schaper and used on the Reichsbahn was used on the rebuilt pylons, carrying one lane of traffic in each direction, and in 1958 this was moved to one side and beside it to the south, a supplemental pillar was erected beside each pylon. When the new replacement roadbed was complete, the temporary bridge was disassembled and the supplemental pillars demolished.

1960 bridge
In 1957, Dyckerhoff & Widmann (Dywidag) won the contract to build a permanent replacement bridge to a design by Gerd Lohmer and Ulrich Finsterwalder. It was the first use in Germany of prestressed concrete trusses. The bridge has a lower deck containing a pedestrian and bicycle path. The bridge was constructed in  segments and the deck concreted in two sections. Construction took place from 1958 to 1960 and the total cost was DM 7.3 million.

1979 supplemental bridge
To accommodate the widening of the autobahn from its original four lanes to six, a supplemental bridge was added to the north to accommodate the northbound, Salzburg – Munich carriageway. This was built in 1977–79 by the Max Aicher construction company and is a hollow prestressed concrete bridge which was launched incrementally from both abutments followed by concreting of the cantilevered deck sections.

References

Further reading
 Luitpold Schmerber and Josef Scheidler. "Wiederinstandsetzung der Pfeiler und Verschiebung der Mangfallbrücke im Zuge der Autobahn München–Salzburg". Der Stahlbau 28.4, 1959, pp. 88–98

External links

 Geoff Walden, Miscellaneous Sites Associated with the Third Reich Part I: Mangfall Bridge, Third Reich in Ruins: period photographs including construction, after destruction in 1945, after rebuilding and widening in 1948
 Mangfall Bridge (Weyarn, 1960) at Structurae

Road bridges in Germany
Bridges completed in 1936
Bridges completed in 1959